Huguette Lachapelle (October 28, 1942 – December 15, 2021) was a Canadian politician. Lachapelle served in the National Assembly of Quebec from 1981 to 1985, representing the Montreal riding of Dorion as a member of the Parti Québécois (PQ).

Early life and career
Lachapelle was born in Saint-Basile, Quebec. She was a graduate of the Elie Business College à Montréal and was a parliamentary aide for PQ cabinet minister Lise Payette from 1976 to 1981.

Legislator
Lachapelle was elected to the Quebec legislature in the 1981 provincial election. She was subsequently elected to the PQ party executive in December 1981, appointed one of three deputy government whips in René Lévesque's government on September 22, 1982, and promoted to chief government whip on December 4, 1984. She served in the latter position until October 23, 1985.

Lévesque resigned as PQ leader and premier in 1985, and Lachapelle supported Pierre-Marc Johnson's successful bid to succeed him. When asked about rival candidate Pauline Marois's prospects of winning, Lachapelle responded that she did not believe Quebecers were ready for a woman to be premier. Johnson distanced himself from this statement, and some political observers believed that it helped to increase Marois's public profile.

Lachapelle was defeated in the 1985 provincial election, losing by a narrow margin to Liberal candidate Violette Trépanier.

After politics
Lachapelle worked in Quebec's justice department from 1986 until her retirement in 2002. She died on December 15, 2021, at the age of 79.

Electoral record

External links

References

1942 births
2021 deaths
French Quebecers
Parti Québécois MNAs
People from Capitale-Nationale
Women MNAs in Quebec